The Men's 100 metres T12 event for the 2000 Summer Paralympics took place at the Stadium Australia.

The T12 category is for athletes with a visual impairment. Athletes in this category will generally have some residual sight, the ability to recognise the shape of a hand at a distance of 2 metres and the ability to perceive clearly will be no more than 2/60. T12 athletes commonly run with guides.

Results

Round 1 
Athletes qualified for the semi-final if they won their heat or achieved one of the 2 fastest other times.

Heat 1

Heat 2

Heat 3

Heat 4

Heat 5

Heat 6

Semi-finals 
Athletes qualified for the final if they won their race, or achieved one of the next 2 fastest times.

Heat 1

Heat 2

Final

References 
 

Athletics at the 2000 Summer Paralympics